The 2013 Suruga Bank Championship was the sixth edition of the Suruga Bank Championship, the club football match co-organized by the Japan Football Association, the football governing body of Japan, CONMEBOL, the football governing body of South America, and J. League, the professional football league of Japan, between the winners of the previous season's J. League Cup and Copa Sudamericana.

The match was contested between Japanese team Kashima Antlers, the 2012 J. League Cup champion, and Brazilian team São Paulo, the 2012 Copa Sudamericana champion. It was hosted by Kashima Antlers at the Kashima Soccer Stadium in Kashima on August 7, 2013.

Kashima Antlers won 3–2 with Yuya Osako scoring a hat-trick, to win their second Suruga Bank Championship title in a row.

Qualified teams

Format
The Suruga Bank Championship was played as a single match, with the J. League Cup champion hosting the match. If the score was tied at the end of regulation, the penalty shoot-out was used to determine the winner (no extra time was played). A maximum of seven substitutions may be made during the match.

Match details

References

External links
スルガ銀行チャンピオンシップ, Japan Football Association 
スルガ銀行チャンピオンシップ, J. League 
Copa Suruga Bank, CONMEBOL.com 

2013
2013 in Japanese football
2013 in South American football
Kashima Antlers matches
São Paulo FC matches
2013 in Brazilian football